Riverside is an unincorporated historic locale in Yamhill County, Oregon, United States. It lies at an elevation of 213 feet (65 m).

References

Unincorporated communities in Yamhill County, Oregon
Unincorporated communities in Oregon